Guy Bara (11 July 1923 – 18 June 2003) is the pseudonym of Guy Willems, a Belgian comic strip writer, artist and cartoonist.

He was born in Riga, Latvia and died in Marseille, France.

He is best known as the creator of the popular Belgian comic Max l'explorateur, he was also an active journalist for La Dernière Heure.

References

External links
  Guy Bara Official website.
  Interview de Guy Bara par Sélim Sasson, 4 mars 1965.
  Notice de Guy Bara sur BD oubliées.com.
  Annonce du décès de Guy Bara, Actua BD, 23 juin 2003.

1923 births
2003 deaths
Writers from Riga
Belgian cartoonists
Belgian comics artists
Belgian comics writers
Belgian humorists
21st-century Belgian journalists
Male journalists
Pseudonymous artists
20th-century Belgian journalists
Latvian emigrants to Belgium
20th-century pseudonymous writers
21st-century pseudonymous writers